Val-de-Meuse is a commune in the Haute-Marne department in north-eastern France.

Val-de-Meuse was created in 1972 by the merger of the former communes of Avrecourt, Épinant, Lécourt, Maulain, Montigny-le-Roi (main area of the new commune), Provenchères-sur-Meuse, Ravennefontaines, Récourt and Saulxures and in 1974 Lénizeul. In 2012 Avrecourt and Saulxures became independent communes again.

See also
Communes of the Haute-Marne department

References

Valdemeuse